James Grant was a Scottish professional footballer who played as a right winger for Brighton.

References

Scottish footballers
Brighton & Hove Albion F.C. players
Eastbourne United A.F.C. players
Year of birth unknown
Year of death unknown
Association football wingers